The LGB Alliance is a British advocacy group founded in the UK in 2019, in opposition to the policies of LGBT rights charity Stonewall on transgender issues. Its founders were Bev Jackson, Kate Harris, Allison Bailey, Malcolm Clark and Ann Sinnott. The organization has said that lesbians are facing "extinction" because of the "disproportionate" focus on transgender identities in schools.

The LGB Alliance describes its objective as "asserting the right of lesbians, bisexuals and gay men to define themselves as same-sex attracted", and states that such a right is threatened by "attempts to introduce confusion between biological sex and the notion of gender".

It has opposed a ban on conversion therapy for trans people in the UK, gender-affirming care including puberty blockers for children reporting gender dysphoria, and gender recognition reform.

The LGB Alliance has been described by the Labour Campaign for Trans Rights as transphobic, in a statement signed by a number of Labour MPs including current Deputy Leader Angela Rayner, and by SNP MP John Nicolson, and by articles in two scholarly journals as "trans-exclusionary". Hope not Hate and the Trades Union Congress have described the group as anti-trans. It has also been described by Labour MPs and several LGBT organisations and activists as a hate group.

The LGB Alliance was granted charitable status by the Charity Commission for England and Wales in April 2021, which was controversial with LGBT groups in the UK, fifty of whom signed an open letter condemning it. A hearing for an appeal against its charitable status started in the First-tier Tribunal in September 2022.

History 

In September 2019, twenty-two people signed an open letter to The Sunday Times accusing leading UK gay-rights charity Stonewall of having "undermined women's sex-based rights and protections" through its policy on transgender issues. It further stated that twelve months earlier, a group had asked Stonewall to commit to "fostering an atmosphere of respectful debate" with those who wished to question its transgender policies, but that Stonewall had refused to allow any such dialogue, and that "if Stonewall remains intransigent, there must surely now be an opening for a new organisation committed both to freedom of speech and to fact instead of fantasy."

One month after the publication of the open letter, it was announced that a new group called the LGB Alliance had been launched. The group was co-founded by Bev Jackson, Kate Harris, Allison Bailey, Malcolm Clark, and Ann Sinnott, with the support of Simon Fanshawe, who spoke at the initial meeting on 22 October 2019 along with Miranda Yardley and Charlie Evans. Harris stated that:

The main difference is that lesbians, gays, and bisexuals have something in common because of our sexual orientation, that has nothing to do with being trans. We welcome the support of anyone — gay, straight or trans — as long as they support our commitment to freedom of speech and biological definitions of sex. So we are a very broad and accepting group. We will be called transphobic, but we're not.

In October 2020, Ann Sinnott, a director of the LGB Alliance at the time, initiated a legal case calling for a judicial review of the Equality and Human Rights Commission's guidance on the Equality Act 2010, crowdfunding almost £100,000 for legal fees. The LGB Alliance believed that the specifics of the Equality Act 2010 have been "misrepresented" by some organisations. In May 2021 the case was found by the court to be unarguable, Justice Henshaw stating that "the claimant has shown no arguable reason to believe the Code has misled or will mislead service providers about their responsibilities under the Act."

In June 2021, the LGB Alliance announced the appointment of five new trustees in addition to Harris, Jackson and documentary producer Malcolm Clark: co-founder of Shed Productions Eileen Gallagher OBE, strategy consultant Conrad Roebar, professor of philosophy Kathleen Stock OBE, professor of human rights law Robert Wintemute and Labour peer Lord Young of Norwood Green. At the same time, Ann Sinnott announced her resignation as a director.

In October 2021, the organisation was hosted with a stand at the Conservative Party Conference, which reportedly cost £6,000. Later that month, the organisation hosted its own conference, with guests including MPs Joanna Cherry, Jackie Doyle-Price and Rosie Duffield, as well as the television comedy writer and anti-trans activist Graham Linehan. A protest against LGB Alliance was held outside the conference venue, attended by Daniel Lismore and the King's College London LGBT+ Society.

On 30 March 2022, the London Community Foundation awarded the LGB Alliance a grant as part of the Arts Council England Let's Create Jubilee Fund, for a film Queens — 70 Years of Queer History. It withdrew the grant in April 2022, after being made aware of the legal challenge against the LGB Alliance's charitable status.

On 10 June 2022, the organisation announced that it had received a grant from the National Lottery Community Fund to create a helpline "for young lesbian, gay and bisexual people and their families and friends."

Charitable status 

In March 2020, the LGB Alliance submitted an application for charitable status to the Charity Commission for England and Wales. Bev Jackson, a founder of the LGB Alliance in a speech stated "We're applying for charitable status and building an organisation to challenge the dominance of those who promote the damaging theory of gender identity."

A petition set up against the application received 30,000 signatures. The application was granted in April 2021. After LGB Alliance was granted the status of charity, the UK Pride Organisers Network released an open letter signed by more than 50 LGBT+ Pride groups across the UK condemning the decision.

In June 2021, a number of groups, including transgender youth charity Mermaids and the Good Law Project, appealed against the decision to grant charitable status, on the basis that it did not "meet the threshold tests to be registered as a charity". They say that the LGB Alliance does not meet two key criteria for charitable status under the Charities Act 2011: that a charity should "give rise to tangible, legally recognised benefits that outweigh any associated harms", and that they "benefit the public or a sufficient section of the public". The Charity Commission reaffirmed its role "to decide whether an organisation's purposes fall within the legal definition of charity" and that objections to the LGB Alliance's application had been "carefully considered" in its original decision to grant charitable status. Lui Asquith, director of legal and policy at Mermaids, said "LGB Alliance purports to be an organisation that supports lesbian, gay and bisexual people, but it doesn't. Many trans people are LGB and LGB Alliance actively works to oppose the advancement of rights of trans individuals." Mermaids were supported in this appeal by the Good Law Project, the LGBT+ Consortium, Gendered Intelligence, Trans Actual, and the LGBT Foundation. A First-tier Tribunal sat from 9 to 16 September 2022 and from 7 to 8 November 2022, with Mermaids, the Charity Commission and the LGB Alliance represented in court. Judgment was reserved until a later date, expected to be early 2023.

Regulatory issues 
In August 2021, the Charity Commission announced that it would be engaging with LGB Alliance trustees after the LGB Alliance posted a Tweet stating that "adding the + to LGB gives the green light to paraphilias like bestiality – and more – to all be part of one big happy 'rainbow family'" which was subsequently removed by Twitter for violating the social media platform's rules.

On 7 September 2022, the LGB Alliance was found by the Fundraising Regulator to have broken its Code of Fundraising Practice in two ways. Firstly by making a "false and misleading" claim that it was the only charity representing lesbian, gay, and bisexual interests. Secondly, it failed to deal correctly with a complaint made about this claim.

Views

Gender identity 

Co-founder Bev Jackson said that lesbians are in danger of extinction due to disproportionate focus on transgender issues in schools: "At school, in university, it is so uncommon, it is the bottom of the heap. Becoming trans is now considered the brave option." She also voiced concern that "If you do not accept that everyone has a gender identity then you are automatically labelled transphobic which means you can no longer discuss women's lives and what's happening to lesbians. We are increasingly discovering that lesbians are no longer welcome in the LGBTQ+ world, which is astonishing."

Jackson has said, "Lesbians don't have penises. A lesbian is a biological woman who is attracted to another biological woman. That's obvious. Or at least it was obvious until a few years ago."

Conversion therapy 
LGB Alliance has opposed the inclusion of transgender people in legislation banning conversion therapy. The LGB Alliance claims that affirmation-based therapy for transgender youth is gay conversion therapy and that campaigns to ban conversion therapy for transgender people are "being used as political cover to promote an affirmation-only approach to gender identity".

Scottish Gender Recognition Act 
LGB Alliance opposed legislation in the Scottish Parliament to change the process of legal recognition of gender to be "based only on self-identification rather than biological sex", and reduce the age of access from 18 to 16.

The group took out adverts in Scotland to campaign against the Scottish government's plan to reform the Gender Recognition Act, stating that the reform would create a "gender free-for-all" and is "a law that could be exploited by predatory men who wish to hurt women and girls". Following a number of complaints to the Advertising Standards Authority over the adverts, the ASA issued the group with an "Advice Notice", advising that the messages could be "potentially misleading" because "the legislation it refers to is still under consultation".

Treatment of gender dysphoric children 
Bev Jackson accused the Tavistock and Portman NHS Foundation Trust, which offers Gender Identity Development Services (GIDS) to children, of "transing out the gay". She also referred to studies which showed that children who identified as transgender were more likely to be autistic, saying she had spoken with a teacher at an SEN (special educational needs) school who told her there were "24 trans kids, one non binary, but no gays and lesbians."

In November 2020, Jackson was quoted in a BBC story about children experiencing delays in access to gender reassignment treatment, saying "We don't think children should be allowed to self-diagnose any medical condition." The next month, Jackson welcomed the High Court verdict in the Bell vs. Tavistock trial, which ruled that children should not be given puberty blockers without court approval. In September 2021, the verdict was overturned by the Court of Appeal.

Media coverage and criticism 
According to journalist Gaby Hinsliff, "The Alliance is seen by many in the LGBT sector as a fringe organisation at best, and at worst a hate group." It has been described as a hate group by Pride in London, Pride in Surrey, the LGBT+ Liberal Democrats, the Labour Campaign for Trans Rights, the Independent Workers' Union of Great Britain, barrister Jolyon Maugham, Green Party of England and Wales co-leader Carla Denyer, journalist Owen Jones and Dr Natacha Kennedy, co-chair of the Feminist Gender Equality Network. Broadcaster India Willoughby has described the group as "baddies masquerading as the good guys." The group has also been described as "anti-trans" by the Trades Union Congress and Hope not Hate. Paul Roberts OBE, CEO of LGBT Consortium said of LGB Alliance "they exist to oppose free, safe and empowered trans lives".

In November 2020, the gay men's magazine Boyz retweeted Twitter posts from the LGB Alliance and responded to criticism by suggesting that people not jump to conclusions about the organisation and instead "hear them out". Companies that advertised in Boyz or stocked the magazine were targeted with threats of boycotts, and at least one venue, the cabaret club Royal Vauxhall Tavern, stopped distributing it. The magazine eventually apologised "for the publicity we have given the LGB Alliance." The Spectator writer Brendan O'Neill wrote a defence of the LGB Alliance after the Boyz controversy, arguing the group was being targeted by left-wing activists who had deprived it of opportunities to raise money by getting it removed from crowdfunding websites and that activists had lobbied to have gay rights activist and LGB Alliance co-founder Allison Bailey investigated by her employers for transphobia.

In December 2020, John Nicolson, Member of Parliament for Ochil and South Perthshire, described the group as "sinister" and said that it was absurd for the BBC to rely on "transphobic groups like the so-called LGB Alliance" to give balance on reports about trans issues, saying "you would never do a report on racism, for example, and call in a racist organisation to say that they don't think black people have a right to equality". In October 2021, Labour Shadow Minister for Women and Equalities Taiwo Owatemi argued that LGB Alliance "should be rejected by all those who believe in equality," saying that LGB Alliance "opposes LGBT+ inclusive education," disregards Gillick competence, and has opposed conversion therapy bans.

The group has been condemned by several MPs, including SNP MP Mhairi Black, Liberal Democrat MP Jamie Stone, and Labour MP Charlotte Nichols. A statement from the Labour Campaign for Trans Rights group calling LGB Alliance transphobic and trans-exclusionist was signed by two of the three candidates in the 2020 party leadership elections, Rebecca Long-Bailey and Lisa Nandy, as well as candidates for deputy leader Dawn Butler and Angela Rayner, the latter being elected deputy leader. In July 2020, the group met with Conservative Minister for Women and Equalities Kemi Badenoch. A number of other Conservative politicians, including MPs Ben Bradley and Jackie Doyle-Price have voiced support for the group.

The LGB Alliance has been described as trans-exclusionary in articles published in the journals Metaphilosophy and the Journal of Gender Studies. A 2021 article in the International Journal of Sociology listed LGB Alliance among "UK lobby groups [that] are successfully pushing a radical agenda to deny the basic rights of trans people." Mike Homfray of the University of Liverpool has argued that "there is ample evidence that the LGB Alliance, far from respecting the existence of trans people, has as a central aim their isolation and separation from LGB people."

Dame Melanie Dawes, chief executive of Ofcom, responding to a comment from MP John Nicolson asking why "transphobic groups like the so-called LGB Alliance" should appear on BBC programming, said quoting anti-trans pressure groups in order to bring balance "can be extremely inappropriate".

Gary Powell, who participated in the LGB Alliance's pre-launch meetings and was involved in the promotion of its launch, has been criticised for speaking at events organised by the Heritage Foundation and writing for the Witherspoon Institute, both American conservative think tanks which have campaigned against LGBT rights. Bev Jackson, one of the founders of the LGB Alliance, has been criticised for saying that "working with the Heritage Foundation is sometimes the only possible course of action" since "the leftwing silence on gender in the US is even worse than in the UK". 

Malcolm Clark, a co-founder of the LGB Alliance, has been criticised for arguing against LGBT+ clubs in schools, saying that he "[doesn't] see the point of LGBT clubs in schools" and citing a risk of "predatory gay teachers". He stated, "There should never, of course, be bullying. But the vast majority of children have not settled on a sexual orientation. Suggesting they do have a sexual orientation is fraught with dangers – for kids" and "Having clubs where kids explore on school grounds …their sexual orientation seems to be unnecessary and potentially dangerous". Co-founders Kate Harris and Bev Jackson declined to comment on these remarks.

LGB Alliance received criticism after giving controversial conservative social media personality Andy Ngo a press pass to their October 2021 conference and saying that "whatever his other work in the past, his work on the Wi Spa controversy was extraordinary and important."

The former UK Conservative MP Ben Howlett has described how the LGB Alliance and Sex Matters lobbied Conservative Party members of parliament in private: "I think one of the core reasons why issues surrounding trans people are going high up the agenda is that there's a lot of Machiavellian stuff going on behind the scenes".

On 5 November 2021, MP John Nicolson said that the Speaker of the House of Commons had referred "abuse and obsessive behaviour" from the LGB Alliance to the House of Commons security as part of a review following the murder of David Amess. LGB Alliance had previously run a fundraising campaign for itself where it pledged that "make a donation to us IN HIS [Nicholson's] NAME and we will tweet out your message," subsequently tweeting a number of statements attacking Nicolson, including one that called him a "rape-enabling politician". The fundraiser had been removed from the JustGiving and GoFundMe crowdfunding platforms for violating their rules.

In May 2022, the organisation urged the closure of all sex venues for one month, including saunas, leather bars and dark rooms, in response to the 2022 monkeypox outbreak.

In November 2022 the group was criticised for excluding the trans victims of the Colorado Springs nightclub shooting in their social media condolences, after which it tweeted: "We stand in solidarity – as LGB people – against all violence and extend our thoughts to ALL the victims of such horror".

In December 2022 Twitch removed the LGB Alliance from its approved list of charities because its 'anti-transgender advocacy' violated the platform's policies against hateful content; over 16,000 people voted for it to be removed. That same month, it was reported that LGB Alliance had office space at 55 Tufton Street, a building also occupied by several controversial right-wing groups promoting climate change denial and anti-immigration politics. The LGB Alliance denied having links to the groups, stating "the office was chosen because it's handy, flexible, and that it became available at the right time".

International groups 

A number of LGB groups have been formed internationally with similar objectives. LGB Alliance promotes 16 of them on its website, in the following countries: Australia, Brazil, Canada, Iceland, Ireland, Mexico, Norway, Poland, Serbia, Spain, USA, Wales, India, Germany, Finland and New Zealand.

Ireland 
In October 2020, a group called LGB Alliance Ireland was launched on Twitter. A number of Irish LGBT+ activists said that group was based in the UK and was mainly composed of British supporters. This was disputed by the group, which stated that "all our committee members are living in Ireland, with representation in each of the four provinces". In November 2020, LGB Alliance Ireland faced criticism after calling for schools to ignore LGBT youth organisation BeLonG To's Stand Up Awareness Week. In August 2022, the Global Project against Hate and Extremism released a report in which it classified LGB Alliance Ireland as a far-right anti-transgender hate group.

Iceland 
In September 2020, a linked group was launched in Iceland, named LBG teymið, with Iva Marín Adrichem as a co-founder. Icelandic national queer organisation Samtökin '78 director Þorbjörg Þorvaldsdóttir condemned the group. The Icelandic group later rebranded as Samtökin 22.

Australia 
In August 2022, LGB Alliance Australia filed an application with Equal Opportunity Tasmania, part of the Tasmanian Department of Justice, for permission to hold drag shows from which trans women would be banned from attending. Tasmania's anti-discrimination commissioner rejected the request. In October 2022, the Global Project against Hate and Extremism released a report in which it classified LGB Alliance Australia as a far-right anti-transgender hate group. LGB Alliance Australia responded that it believed GPAHE had misrepresented it.

Canada 
In November 2020, LGB Alliance Canada submitted a brief in opposition to a proposed ban on conversion therapy.

See also 
 Diversity Champions
 Woman's Place UK
 Nolan Investigates

References

External links 

Advocacy groups in the United Kingdom
2019 establishments in the United Kingdom
LGBT-related controversies in the United Kingdom
Organisations that oppose transgender rights in the United Kingdom